Capo d'Orlando Lighthouse is an active lighthouse located at the foot of a rocky ridge, north of the municipality of Capo d'Orlando on the Tyrrhenian Sea.

Description
The tower, recently painted, is a red terra cotta decorated with white trim, the lantern is white and the lantern dome is grey metallic. The lighthouse is completely automated and managed by the Marina Militare with the identification code number 3264 E.F.

See also
 List of lighthouses in Italy

References

External links
 Servizio Fari Marina Militare

Lighthouses in Italy
Buildings and structures in the Metropolitan City of Messina
Lighthouses completed in 1904
1904 establishments in Italy
Capo d'Orlando